San Miguel Department may refer to:
 San Miguel Department (El Salvador)
 San Miguel Department, Corrientes, Argentina

Department name disambiguation pages